The Soviet Union men's national under-21 volleyball team represents the Soviet Union in international men's volleyball competitions and friendly matches under the age 21. It was ruled by the Soviet Volleyball Federation, that was an affiliate member of the Federation of International Volleyball (FIVB) as well it was a part of the European Volleyball Confederation (CEV).

Results

FIVB U21 World Championship
 Champions   Runners-up   3rd place   4th place

Europe U21 / 20 Championship
 Champions   Runners-up   3rd place   4th place

Team

Past Squads

References

External links
 Official website 

National men's under-21 volleyball teams
U
Volleyball in the Soviet Union